FC Red Bull Salzburg is an Austrian professional football club based in Wals-Siezenheim, that competes in the Austrian Bundesliga, the top flight of Austrian Football. Their home ground is the Red Bull Arena. Due to sponsorship restrictions, the club is known as FC Salzburg and wears a modified crest when playing in UEFA competitions.

The club was known as SV Austria Salzburg, and had several sponsored names, before being bought by Red Bull GmbH in 2005 who renamed the club and changed its colours from its traditional violet and white to red and white. The change resulted in some of the team's fans forming a new club, SV Austria Salzburg.

Founded in 1933, the club won its first Bundesliga title in 1994, which was the first of three in the span of four seasons which also saw them reach the 1994 UEFA Cup final. The club has won sixteen league titles and nine Austrian Cups, all nine of which came as doubles, as well as three Austrian Supercups.

History

1933–1953, founding, promotion to A-league
FC RB Salzburg was founded on 13 September 1933 as SV Austria Salzburg, after the merger of the city's two clubs, Hertha and Rapid. In 1950, the club was dissolved but re-founded later the same year. It reached the Austrian top flight in 1953, and finished 9th of 14 clubs in its first season there, avoiding relegation by five points.

1953–1970 
Vienna-born Erich Probst was Salzburg's first-ever international, earning the last of his 19 Austrian caps on 27 March 1960. Adolf Macek, who made the first of his four international appearances on 9 October 1965, was the club's first local player to earn a cap for Austria.

1970–1990 
Salzburg were top-flight runners-up for the first time in the 1970–71 season, gaining 43 points to Wacker Innsbruck's 44. The club's first-ever European campaign was in the 1971–72 UEFA Cup, and it was eliminated 5–4 on aggregate by Romanian club UTA despite a 3–1 home victory in the second leg. In 1974, Salzburg reached the Austrian Cup final for the first time, losing 2–1 away to Austria Wien in the first leg before a 1–1 home draw in the second.

In 1978, the club's official name was changed to SV Casino Salzburg and in 1997, to SV Wüstenrot Salzburg, due to a sponsorship deal with an Austrian financial services corporation. The team often remained referred to as SV Austria Salzburg.

1990–2010 
Salzburg reached their first and so far only European final, the 1994 UEFA Cup final, where they lost both legs 1–0 to Inter Milan. That same season, Salzburg won their first Bundesliga title, beating Austria Wien by 51 points to 49. The title was retained the following season as Salzburg beat Sturm Graz on goal difference. The 1995–96 season saw a drop to eighth place, one above a relegation play-off, but the club's third title in four seasons was won in 1997 as they beat holders Rapid Wien by three points.

Salzburg's inaugural UEFA Champions League campaign in 1994–95 saw them reach the group stage by beating Israel's Maccabi Haifa 5–2 on aggregate. They were drawn into Group D with holders and eventual finalists Milan and eventual winners Ajax, as well as AEK Athens. Despite drawing both matches with Ajax, Salzburg picked up a solitary 3–1 win away in Athens and were eliminated in third place.

The club moved to its current stadium in 2003.

The Red Bull takeover
The Red Bull company headed by Dietrich Mateschitz purchased the Salzburg Sport AG on 6 April 2005. The club's bylaws were amended so that the Red Bull Salzburg GmbH has the sole right to appoint and recall board members of the club. After the takeover, Mateschitz changed the club's name, management, and staff, declaring "this is a new club with no history". The club's website initially claimed that it was founded in 2005, but was ordered to remove this claim by the Austrian Football Association. The new authority removed all trace of violet from the club logo and the team now play in the colours of red and white, to the consternation of much of the club's traditional support. A small pair of wings form the motif of the new club crest, displayed on the team jersey, in accordance with Red Bull's commercial slogan at the time: "gives you wings". This complete re-branding of the team proved very similar to Red Bull's treatment of its two Formula One racing teams, Red Bull Racing and Scuderia Toro Rosso, now rebranded as Scuderia AlphaTauri. Red Bull, however, would not completely follow this precedent when it acquired the MetroStars club in Major League Soccer (MLS) in the United States; while it rebranded the team as the New York Red Bulls, it chose to recognise the MetroStars' history.

The traditional supporters tried to resist the radical changes and formed their own movement in order to regain some of the tradition. Several fan-clubs throughout Europe voiced their support in what they saw as a fight against the growing commercialisation of football. However, after five months of protests and talks between the club owners and traditional fans, no compromise was reached. On 15 September 2005, the "violet" supporters stated that the talks had irreversibly broken down and efforts to reach an agreement would be terminated.

This gave rise to two separate fan groups: the "Red-Whites", who support "Red Bull Salzburg" and the "Violet-Whites", who want to preserve the 72-year-old tradition and refuse to support the rebranded club. The Violet-Whites ultimately formed a new club, Austria Salzburg after viewing Red Bull's offer to maintain the original colours only for the goalkeeper's socks at away games as an insult.

The club's history going back to 1933 was later restored on the club website.

Red Bull era

In May 2006, Red Bull announced on their website that they had hired veteran Italian coach Giovanni Trapattoni, together with his former player, German FIFA World Cup winner Lothar Matthäus, as co-trainers. The pair initially denied having reached a deal, but officially signed on 23 May 2006. Red Bull ultimately won the 2006–07 Bundesliga by a comfortable margin with five games still left in the season after drawing 2–2 with previous season's champions Austria Wien on 28 April 2007.

Red Bull were beaten by Shakhtar Donetsk in the third qualifying round of the 2007–08 UEFA Champions League, and were then knocked out of the 2007–08 UEFA Cup in the first round by AEK Athens. On 13 February 2008, Giovanni Trapattoni confirmed that he would be taking over as the new Republic of Ireland national team manager in May. In his final season, the club finished as runners-up, six points behind champions Rapid Wien. Trapattoni was succeeded by Co Adriaanse, under whom they finished as champions, but he left after one year. His successor was Huub Stevens. On 14 May 2010, Stevens' Red Bull retained the Bundesliga.

2010–2020 

Stevens was replaced by Dutchman Ricardo Moniz at the end of the 2010–11 season, in which Red Bull were denied a third consecutive title by Sturm Graz, who won the league by a three-point margin. Red Bull finished second in the league, and qualified for the following season's UEFA Europa League. Moniz was ordered to integrate young players from the Junior squad: at the beginning of the 2011–12 season Daniel Offenbacher, Martin Hinteregger, Georg Teigl and Marco Meilinger were promoted to the first team. In the 2011–12 season, Red Bull won the Bundesliga league title and Cup double.

After the 2011–12 season, Moniz departed his post despite having a year remaining on his contract. The new coach for the 2012–13 season was Roger Schmidt, who came from SC Paderborn of the German 2. Bundesliga. In July 2012, Red Bull were knocked out of the Champions League in the second qualifying round against F91 Dudelange of Luxembourg, losing the first leg 1–0 away, followed by a 4–3 home win which saw the club eliminated on away goals.

After that, the team was changed fundamentally. At the end of the transfer period, new players were purchased: Valon Berisha, Kevin Kampl, Håvard Nielsen, Sadio Mané, Isaac Vorsah, Rodnei. In the 2012–13 season, the team finished second in the league, behind champions Austria Wien. They recaptured the league title the following season with an 11-point margin over the runners-up. Also, in the 2014–15 season, they won both the Bundesliga and the cup as they did again in the 2015–16 season. In December 2014, the coach Peter Zeidler was dismissed and replaced for the last two matches in the first half of the season by Thomas Letsch. Then Óscar García took over.

Also in the next 2016–17 season, Salzburg won both the Bundesliga and the cup. In 2018, Salzburg lost the cup final against Sturm Graz. At the beginning of the 2017–18 season, Marco Rose became coach after Óscar García left the club. In the UEFA Europa League, Salzburg reached the semi-finals in which they lost to Olympique de Marseille 2–3 on aggregate after extra time, having won during the campaign against Borussia Dortmund and Lazio.

After eleven failed attempts to reach the group stage, Red Bull only managed to qualify directly to the 2019–20 Champions League, since the 2018–19 UEFA Champions League winner, Liverpool, qualified to the competition via their domestic league.

In the years from 2013 to 2019, Salzburg earned €300 million from transfers of players like Munas Dabbur, Xaver Schlager, Stefan Lainer, Hannes Wolf, Diadie Samassekou, Takumi Minamino, Erling Haaland.

2020–present 
In 2021, Salzburg had a transfer balance of €218 million for the last five seasons, behind UEFA Champions League participants Ajax (€242 million) and Benfica (more than €335 million). Salzburg had a positive balance in every year. In the 2020-21 and 2021-22 season they reached both the Championship and the Cup final. In the 2021-22 UEFA Champions League they reached the knock-out stage for the first time. In the round of 16 they played versus FC Bayern München.

Relationship with RB Leipzig
In 2009, Red Bull bought an amateur club in Leipzig, Germany and re-named them RasenBallsport Leipzig (so named to circumvent local rules on corporate naming) with the aim of establishing a leading branded team in that country in a similar mould to its existing franchises in Salzburg and other locations. Over the next decade, Leipzig became the owners' main football project, and the close relationship between the teams was exemplified by the number of players moving between them (Georg Teigl, Marcel Sabitzer, Yordy Reyna and Stefan Ilsanker all transferred from Salzburg to Leipzig) with some of the Austrian fans becoming increasingly annoyed at their best players being signed by the 'step-sibling' club in their mission to climb through the levels of German football. There are also links between their youth systems and scouting networks.

Having finished as runners-up in their debut season in the German top flight, RB Leipzig gained entry to continental football for the first time, specifically the 2017–18 UEFA Champions League for which Red Bull Salzburg had also qualified as Austrian champions; this raised the issue of a possible conflict of interest between the clubs due to the level of influence exerted by Red Bull over both teams and the close sporting relationship between them in various aspects. After examining the operational structures during June 2017, UEFA declared themselves satisfied under their regulations that the two clubs (particularly Salzburg) were suitably independent from the Red Bull corporation, and sufficiently distinct from one another, for both to be admitted to their competitions. In the first season following that ruling, both reached the quarter-finals of the 2017–18 UEFA Europa League but did not play each other, with RB Leipzig eliminated by Olympique de Marseille who then also knocked out Salzburg in the semi-finals. However, in the next edition of the same competition, RB Leipzig and Red Bull Salzburg were drawn together in Group B to meet competitively for the first time. Salzburg were the victors in both fixtures between the clubs (3–2 in Germany, 1–0 in Austria) and also won all their other matches to top the group, while Leipzig failed to progress after dropping further points against Celtic and Rosenborg. On 17 December 2020, Dominik Szoboszlai poised to become the second RB Salzburg player to move to RB Leipzig in space of 6 months after Hwang Hee-chan completed the switch in summer.

Honours
Austrian Bundesliga
Champions (16): 1993–94*, 1994–95*, 1996–97*, 2006–07, 2008–09, 2009–10, 2011–12, 2013–14, 2014–15, 2015–16, 2016–17, 2017–18, 2018–19, 2019–20, 2020–21, 2021–22
Runners-up (4): 2005–06, 2007–08, 2010–11, 2012–13

Austrian Cup
Winners (9): 2011–12, 2013–14, 2014–15, 2015–16, 2016–17, 2018–19, 2019–20, 2020–21, 2021–22
Runners-up (5): 1973–74*, 1979–80*, 1980–81*, 1999–2000*, 2017–18
Austrian Supercup
Winners: 1994*, 1995*, 1997*

Austrian First League
Winners: 1977–78*, 1986–87*

UEFA Cup
Runners-up: 1993–94*

UEFA Youth League
 Winners: 2016–17
Runners-up: 2021–22
* as SV Austria Salzburg

European competition history

Overall record
Accurate as of 23 February 2023

Legend: GF = Goals For. GA = Goals Against. GD = Goal Difference.

Q = Qualification
PO = Play-Off
KRPO = Knockout Round Play-Off
QF = Quarter-final
SF = Semi-final

Matches

UEFA coefficient ranking

Players

Current squad

Out on loan

Coaching staff

FC Liefering

Since 2012, FC Liefering, currently participating in the Austrian First League, has been a farm team for Red Bull Salzburg.

Coaching history

  K. Bauer (1933–1939) 	
  Wache (1945)	
  Anton Janda (1946–1947)	
  Ernst Schönfeld (1952)	
  Max Breitenfelder (1953)	
  Karl Sesta (1954–55)
  Josef Graf (1955)
  Gyula Szomoray (1956–57)
  Günter Praschak (1957)
  Franz Feldinger (1958)
  Karl Humenberger (1959)
  Erich Probst (1959–60)
  Karl Vetter (1960–61)
  Ignac Molnár (1962–63)
  Günter Praschak (1965–69)
  Karl Schlechta (1969–71)
  Erich Hof (1 July 1971 – 31 December 1971)
  Michael Pfeiffer (1972)
  Josip Šikić (1972–73)
  Günter Praschak (1973–75)
  Alfred Günthner (1975)
  Hans Reich (1976)
  Günter Praschak (1977)
  Alfred Günthner (1977–80)
  Rudolf Strittich (1980)
  August Starek (5 October 1980 – 30 June 1981)
  Joszef Obert (1 July 1981 – 11 May 1984)	
  Hannes Winklbauer (13 May 1984 – 2 November 1985)
  Adolf Blutsch (6 November 1985 – 30 June 1986)
  Hannes Winklbauer (1 July 1986 – 16 April 1988)
  Kurt Wiebach (18 April 1988 – 30 June 1991)
  Otto Barić (11 July 1991 – 29 August 1995)
  Hermann Stessl (29 August 1995 – 2 March 1996)
  Heribert Weber (7 March 1996 – 31 March 1998)
  Hans Krankl (2 April 1998 – 9 January 2000)
  Miroslav Polak (10 January 2000 – 30 June 2000)
  Hans Backe (1 July 2000 – 10 September 2001)
  Lars Søndergaard (11 September 2001 – 29 October 2003)
  Peter Assion (int.) (1 November 2003 – 31 December 2003)
  Walter Hörmann (int.) (1 January 2004 – 15 March 2004)
  Peter Assion (16 March 2004 – 31 March 2005)
  Nikola Jurčević (7 March 2005 – 18 April 2005)
  Manfred Linzmaier (int.) (18 April 2005 – 30 June 2005)
  Kurt Jara (1 July 2005 – 31 May 2006)
  Giovanni Trapattoni (1 June 2006 – 30 April 2008)
  Co Adriaanse (1 July 2008 – 15 June 2009)
  Huub Stevens (15 June 2009 – 8 April 2011)
  Ricardo Moniz (8 April 2011 – 12 June 2012)
  Roger Schmidt (1 July 2012 – 31 May 2014)
  Adi Hütter (1 June 2014 – 15 June 2015)
  Peter Zeidler (22 June 2015 – 3 December 2015)
  Thomas Letsch (int.) (3 December 2015 – 28 December 2015)
  Óscar García (28 December 2015 – 15 June 2017)
  Marco Rose (23 June 2017 – 20 June 2019)
  Jesse Marsch (20 June 2019 – 30 June 2021)
  Matthias Jaissle (1 July 2021 – present)

See also
 RB Leipzig
 New York Red Bulls
 Red Bull Bragantino
 EHC Red Bull München
 EC Red Bull Salzburg

References

External links

  

 
1933 establishments in Austria
Association football clubs established in 1933
Red Bull Salzburg
Red Bull sports teams